George Watt Sutherland (7 May 1903 – 10 May 1951) was a Canadian all-round track and field athlete. He was the hammer throw gold medallist at the 1938 British Empire Games. He also took a bronze medal in the discus throw at the same competition. He had been the runner-up in the hammer in 1934 British Empire Games.

He was born to Donald Mowat Sutherland in Edinburgh, Scotland and later migrated to Canada. He died in Alberta, Canada and his wife, Audrey Ameila Banister, outlived him by over thirty years.

Sutherland represented Canada internationally at the British Empire Games in a wide variety of events. On his first appearance at the inaugural 1930 British Empire Games he failed to post a mark in the discus and hammer, but managed fourth place in the triple jump. At the following edition in 1934 he entered five events – all the throws and also the triple jump. He ranked in the top eight in discus and shot put and came away with his first major medal with a silver in the hammer throw. At his third a final outing at the 1938 Sydney Games he entered three throwing events. He ranked eighth in the shot put.

He was inducted into the Canadian Olympic Hall of Fame in 1956 and into the Alberta Sports Hall of Fame in 1958. He was a four-time winner of the hammer throw at the Canadian Track and Field Championships and also won national titles in the shot put and javelin throw. He also won 35 regional Alberta championship titles during his career.

National titles
Canadian Track and Field Championships
Hammer throw: 1931, 1932, 1934, and 1937
Javelin throw: 1931
Shot put: 1937

International competitions

References

1903 births
1951 deaths
Alberta Sports Hall of Fame inductees
Athletes (track and field) at the 1930 British Empire Games
Athletes (track and field) at the 1934 British Empire Games
Athletes (track and field) at the 1938 British Empire Games
Canadian male discus throwers
Canadian male hammer throwers
Canadian male javelin throwers
Canadian male shot putters
Canadian male triple jumpers
Commonwealth Games gold medallists for Canada
Commonwealth Games medallists in athletics
Scottish emigrants to Canada
Sportspeople from Alberta
Sportspeople from Edinburgh
20th-century Canadian people
Medallists at the 1934 British Empire Games
Medallists at the 1938 British Empire Games